Alex or Alexander Jackson may refer to:

A. Y. Jackson (1882–1974), Canadian painter and founding member of the Group of Seven
Alex Jackson (footballer, born 1905) (1905–1946), Scottish international footballer (Aberdeen, Huddersfield Town, Chelsea)
Alex Jackson (footballer, born 1935), Scottish footballer (Birmingham City)
Alexandra Jackson (born 1952), Irish swimmer
Alexander Jackson (sport shooter), British sport shooter
Alex Jackson (baseball) (born 1995), baseball player
Alexander Cosby Jackson (1773–1827), British Army general
A. J. Jackson, American filmmaker and musician
Alexander L. Jackson (1891–1973), African American business owner and civic leader

See also
Alec Jackson (disambiguation)